Anna Catherine Stanley  (née Rowberry, born 31 March 1976 in Christchurch, New Zealand) is a New Zealand netballer, who captained the national team (the Silver Ferns), to win the 2003 Netball World Championships in Jamaica.

She led the Silver Ferns to a drought-breaking series win over Australia (the first since 1989) in the winter of 2004, and played for the Auckland Diamonds in the National Bank Cup national league in 2004 and 2005.

Early life
The daughter of a former New Zealand player, Stanley had not played senior provincial netball when she was sent to her international debut against Jamaica in 1994. Her career dipped to its lowest point when sidelined by selectors for 18 months, but she was recalled in 2002.

Stanley is renowned in netball circles as an outstanding athlete and for her speed through court and trademark bullet pass.

Career
Stanley represented Otago, Canterbury and Auckland in New Zealand's top netball league. In 2004, she suffered a knee injury during the Silver Ferns' clean sweep series win over arch-rivals Australia. In 2005, after several months of rehabilitation, she returned to the court for the Auckland Diamonds. She returned to the Silver Ferns in October of that year, and was a member of the Commonwealth Games gold medal-winning team of March 2006.

Only a few weeks into the 2006 National Bank Cup season, she announced that she was pregnant and would be retiring from netball to concentrate on her family life, thus ending a fluctuating but successful career on the court. Stanley was named in the Waikato-Bay of Plenty Magic squad in New Zealand's top netball league in 2007, however she did not play this season for the team in the league.

Instead Stanley devoted time to motherhood, and in 2007 became an Ambassador for Rett New Zealand, an organisation to assist children and their families that suffer from Rett syndrome. In 2008 with the start of the ANZ Championship, Stanley has been a television presenter and netball commentator with Sky Sports. She also co-hosts the weekly netball magazine style show On Court with Kathryn Harby-Williams and Tania Dalton. She finished her international career with 91 caps.

Personal life
Stanley is married to medical surgeon and former Auckland and All Black rugby union player, Jeremy Stanley. While pregnant with their first child, Jaya, Stanley and her husband relocated from her Mount Maunganui base to Whangarei.

Honours
Anna Stanley was appointed a Member of the New Zealand Order of Merit for services to netball in the 2004 New Year Honours.

References

External links
Brief biography on xtramsn.com

1976 births
Living people
New Zealand netball players
New Zealand international netball players
Commonwealth Games gold medallists for New Zealand
Commonwealth Games silver medallists for New Zealand
Netball players from Christchurch
Members of the New Zealand Order of Merit
Commonwealth Games medallists in netball
Netball players at the 1998 Commonwealth Games
Netball players at the 2002 Commonwealth Games
Netball players at the 2006 Commonwealth Games
New Zealand netball commentators
Anna
1995 World Netball Championships players
1999 World Netball Championships players
2003 World Netball Championships players
Auckland Diamonds players
Waikato Bay of Plenty Magic players
Medallists at the 2006 Commonwealth Games